William Reuben Farmer (1921 – December 31, 2000) was an American New Testament scholar, professor of theology at Southern Methodist University, and advocate of ecumenism.

Biography
Farmer studied at Cambridge University in England and Union Theological Seminary in New York (the home of famous teachers such as Reinhold Niebuhr and Paul Tillich, among others).  He graduated seminary in 1952.  Farmer was then ordained as a minister of the United Methodist Church.  He became a professor at the Perkins School of Theology at Southern Methodist University in Dallas, Texas in 1959 or 1960.  There, he was known as an associate and ally to Albert Outler, a Protestant historian of the church who closely observed and studied the Catholic Church and supported both the paleo-orthodox and the ecumenical movement.  Farmer supported the Southern Christian Leadership Conference (SCLC) and served on its board of directors in supporting civil rights for African-Americans in Dallas.  In 1990 at the age of 67, he also joined the Roman Catholic Church as a lay member.  He attempted to stay in both churches at once as a nod toward ecumenism, but was unable; the Methodist Judicial Council ruled that joining another denomination automatically terminates UMC membership. After his retirement and conversion, he did occasional projects with the University of Dallas, a Catholic University in Irving, such as editing a volume of Bible commentaries from a Catholic and ecumenical perspective.  Farmer died in 2000 in Dallas of prostate cancer.

Works
Farmer's most notable area of research was the synoptic problem, or the question of the nature of the connection between the gospels of Matthew, Mark, and Luke.  In his 1964 book The Synoptic Problem: A Critical Analysis, he disputes the two-source hypothesis that had generally become accepted among historians of Christianity in the 20th century (and still is accepted today) which suggests that Mark and an unknown tradition called "Q" were used to write Matthew and Luke.  Rather, he supported a variant of the older Matthean priority theory that suggests the Gospel of Matthew came first, the view of many early Church fathers such as Augustine.  Farmer called his preferred version the two-gospel hypothesis, and suggests instead that Mark was the latest gospel that drew from both Matthew and Luke.  In a 1992 paper, Farmer suggested the movement for Marcan priority originated as an effect of the German  in the 1870s, a political and cultural struggle between the largely Lutheran government of the German Empire and the German Catholic Church.  In this view, playing down the importance of Matthew would show that the Catholic Church was "wrong" and weaken their claims of canonical authority, opening the way for the Protestant-led government to seize authority and power.  Farmer himself admits that any such government tampering was implicit, however, and has found few supporters for this view.

A partial list of books authored:
 
  (Reprinted in 1976)
  
 

A partial list of books where he served as editor:
  
  (with Henning Graf Reventlow)

References

External links
 Published works of William R. Farmer

1921 births
2000 deaths
New Testament scholars
Southern Methodist University faculty
American United Methodist clergy
Converts to Roman Catholicism from Methodism
People in Christian ecumenism
Alumni of the University of Cambridge
Union Theological Seminary (New York City) alumni
Deaths from prostate cancer